Nicholas Winograd is an American chemist, currently the Evan Pugh University Professor at Pennsylvania State University and an Elected Fellow of the American Association for the Advancement of Science.

References

Year of birth missing (living people)
Living people
Fellows of the American Association for the Advancement of Science
Pennsylvania State University faculty
21st-century American chemists
Case Western Reserve University alumni